The 1970 United States Senate election in California was held on November 3, 1970. 

Incumbent Republican Senator George Murphy lost re-election to a second term to Democratic Congressman John V. Tunney. This election was the first since 1860 in which California sent two Democrats to the U.S. Senate.

Republican primary

Candidates
 Robert Amequista
 Robert R. Barry, former U.S. Representative from New York and unsuccessful candidate for Representative from California in 1966, 1967, and 1968
 Katharine Marros
 George Murphy, incumbent Senator
 Norton Simon, billionaire industrialist and philanthropist

Results

Democratic primary

Candidates
 Eileen Anderson, candidate for Mayor of Los Angeles in 1969
 Arthur Bell Jr.
 George E. Brown Jr., U.S. Representative from Monterey Park
 Louis Di Salvo
 Kenneth Hahn, Los Angeles County Supervisor
 Leonard Kurland
 John V. Tunney, U.S. Representative from Riverside

Results

General election

Results

See also 
 1970 United States Senate elections

References 

1970
California
United States Senate